Bacterial translation, the process by which messenger RNA is translated into proteins in bacteria
Archaeal translation, the process by which messenger RNA is translated into proteins in archaea

See also
 Prokaryote
 Translation (biology)